Nurse Researcher is a bimonthly nursing journal published by RCNi. It covers research methodology and relevant to the practice of nursing research.

See also
 List of nursing journals

External links
 

General nursing journals
English-language journals
Bimonthly journals
Royal College of Nursing publications